Parson James (born June 7, 1994) is an American singer and songwriter. He is best known for his single "Stole the Show", a collaboration with Norwegian producer Kygo. The song became a hit in a number of countries as well as receiving certifications in Italy, New Zealand, Norway, and the United Kingdom. He has collaborated with various artists including on the song "Insomnia" by Audien. On February 5, 2016, he released his extended play release The Temple EP on Sony Music with a full studio album due later on RCA Records.

Biography
James was born Ashton Parson in Cheraw of an interracial relationship, with his father being black and his mother white. His mother, just 16, was kicked out of her parents' house because of the relationship. He and his single mother faced hardship in Cheraw, South Carolina, where he was born and raised and where he grew up singing hymns in church. At 17, he decided to move to New York City, partly because he wanted wider possibilities than his conservative hometown would offer to a bi-racial and gay young man.

James signed with RCA Records in early 2015 after the release of his first single, "Stole the Show", a collaboration he co-wrote with Kygo. The song became a hit in a number of countries as well as receiving certifications in Italy, New Zealand, Norway, and the United Kingdom. The video to the song was released at the YouTube Music Awards, with the duo also performing a cover of Tove Lo's single "Habits" on BBC One's Live Lounge.

Parson followed-up with his solo debut, "Sinner Like You", a song produced by Elof Loelv. In addition to releasing his own music under RCA, he has collaborated with additional artists including on the song "Insomnia" by Audien.

On 5 February 2016, he released his extended play release The Temple EP on Sony Music with a full studio album due later in the year on RCA Records. The EP included the title track "Temple", plus "Slow Dance with the Devil", "Sinner Like You", his great hit "Stole the Show" and finally "Waiting Game". James also appeared on Late Night with Seth Meyers performing "Temple" from the EP after having been featured with Kygo in February 2016, performing "Stole the Show" live on The Tonight Show Starring Jimmy Fallon alongside Kygo. The track "Waiting Game" from The Temple EP got huge exposure when Trent Harmon, a contestant in season 15, the last season of the American Idol performed it after a suggestion by judge and mentor Keith Urban. In April 2016, James was featured on the cover and in the pages of Hello Mr., and in November 2016 was picked as "Artist of the Month" by Elvis Duran performing his single "Sad Song" during the NBC's Today show with Kathie Lee and Hoda Kotb.

In February 2021, Parson James joined the roster of Prescription Songs.

Discography

Extended plays

Singles

As lead artist

As featured artist

References

External links
 Parson James official website 

American male singer-songwriters
Living people
RCA Records artists
People from Cheraw, South Carolina
American LGBT singers
American LGBT songwriters
LGBT people from South Carolina
1994 births
Gay singers
Gay songwriters
21st-century American male singers
American gay musicians
20th-century LGBT people
21st-century LGBT people
Singer-songwriters from South Carolina